Matthew Sleeth may refer to:

 Matthew Sleeth (visual artist) (born 1972), Australian contemporary visual artist
 Matthew Sleeth (Christian environmentalist), author, speaker, and advocate of creation care